NiceFutis is a women's association football club from Pori, Finland. It was established in 1989 as the women's section of PPT Pori was disbanded. NiceFutis has played in the Finnish women's premier division  Kansallainen Liiga since 2008.

The club's name includes a wordplay. The pronunciation of the English word "nice" sounds in Finnish like "nais", the root of the Finnish word for woman ("nainen") when used in compound words. So the name of the club can be understood as "ladies' soccer" or "nice soccer".

League record 2008-2015

See also
 Antero Kivelä

References

External links 
 

Women's football clubs in Finland
Sport in Pori
Association football clubs established in 1989
1989 establishments in Finland
Sport in Satakunta